Senapura railway station is a station on Konkan Railway in Byndoor Taluk Udupi District. It is at a distance of  down from origin. The preceding station on the line is Bijoor railway station and the next station is Kundapura railway station.

References 

Railway stations along Konkan Railway line
Railway stations in Udupi district
Karwar railway division